The Deir ez-Zor Camps were concentration camps in the heart of the Syrian desert in which many thousands of Armenian refugees were forced into death marches during the Armenian genocide. The United States vice-consul in Aleppo, Jesse B. Jackson, estimated that Armenian refugees, as far east as Deir ez-Zor and south of Damascus, numbered 150,000, all of whom were virtually destitute.

History
Those Armenians who survived during the genocide in 1915-1916 were driven onwards in two directions: towards Damascus or along the Euphrates to Deir ez-Zor. During the early period of massacres, 30,000 Armenians were encamped in various camps outside the town of Deir ez-Zor. They were under the protection of the Arab governor, Ali Suad Bey, until the Ottoman authorities decided to replace him with Salih Zeki Bey, who was known for his cruelty and barbarity. When the refugees, including women and children, reached Deir ez-Zor, they cooked grass, ate dead birds, and although there was a cave near a place called Deir ez-Zor that was used at the end of one march to store prisoners until they starved, no "camp" seems ever to have been planned for the Armenians.

According to Minority Rights Group,

Those who survived the long journey south were herded into huge open-air concentration camps, the grimmest of which was Deir-ez-Zor... where they were starved and killed by sadistic guards. A small number escaped through the secret protection of friendly Arabs from villages in Northern Syria.

According to Christopher J. Walker, "'Deportation' was just a euphemism for mass murder. No provision was made for their journey or exile, and unless they could bribe their guards, they were forbidden in almost all cases food and water". Those who survived landed up between Jerablus and Deir ez-Zor, "a vast and horrific open-air concentration camp".

Armenian genocide

The Ottoman government persecuted the Armenian people and forced them to march out to the Syrian city of Deir al-Zour and the surrounding desert without any facilities and supplies that would have been necessary to sustain the life of hundreds of thousands of Armenian deportees during and after their forced march to the Syrian desert.

Haj Fadel Al-Aboud, who was the mayor of Deir al-Zour, provided them with food and housing and means of livelihood and security. The Armenians returned the favor to Al-Aboud when French colonial authorities sentenced him to death in Aleppo; they supported and defended him, which led the French to reduce the sentence to exile in Jisr al-Shughur.

Memorial

In the village of Margadeh, (88 km from Deir ez-Zor, an Armenian chapel dedicated to those massacred there during the genocide "houses some of the bones of the dead". Lebanese and Syrians make pilgrimages to this memorial organized by the Armenian Apostolic Church of Aleppo.

Nouritza Matossian wrote for Armenian Voice:

Last month I visited the desert of Deir-ez-Zor in the killing fields, caves and rivers where a million Armenians perished. I was shown a piece of land that keeps subsiding. It is called the Place of the Armenians. So many thousands of bodies were buried there that the ground has been sinking for the last 80 years. Human thigh bones and ribs come to the surface.

"For Armenians, Der Zor has come to have a meaning approximate to Auschwitz", wrote Peter Balakian in The New York Times. "Each, in different ways, an epicenter of death and a systematic process of mass-killing; each a symbolic place, an epigrammatic name on a dark map. Der Zor is a term that sticks with you, or sticks on you, like a burr or thorn: "r" "z" "or" — hard, sawing, knifelike". In 2010, the President of Armenia, Serzh Sarkisian, stated: "Quite often historians and journalists soundly compare Deir ez Zor with Auschwitz saying that 'Deir ez Zor is the Auschwitz of the Armenians'. I think that the chronology forces us to formulate the facts in a reverse way: 'Auschwitz is the Deir ez Zor of the Jews'.

The memorial and museum were destroyed by ISIL in 2014. The site was recaptured in 2017. Syrian President Bashar al-Assad has pledged to restore the site, as part of the rebuilding of Syria.

Gallery

See also

 Deir ez-Zor
 Fadel Al-Aboud
 Haj Fadel Government
 Armenian Genocide Memorial Church, Der Zor
Church of the Holy Mother of God (Aleppo)
Death march
Holy See of Cilicia
List of Armenian genocide memorials
Armenian Apostolic Church
Armenian genocide
Armenians in Syria
Destruction of cultural heritage by ISIL

References

Further reading
 
 
 
 
 2011 Documentary Film — Grandma's Tattoos (dir. )

External links
 Deir ez-Zor Armenian Genocide Memorial
 Deir ez-Zor Armenian Genocide Memorial Church at YouTube
 Monument and Memorial Complex at Der Zor, Syria

Armenian genocide commemoration
Armenian genocide extermination centers
20th century in Syria
Aleppo vilayet
Buildings and structures in Deir ez-Zor
Christianity in the Ottoman Empire